LXQt is a free and open source lightweight desktop environment. It was formed from the merger of the LXDE and Razor-qt projects.

Like its GTK predecessor LXDE, LXQt does not ship or develop its own window manager, instead LXQt lets the user decide which (supported) window manager they want to use. Linux distributions commonly default LXQt to Openbox or Xfwm4 or KWin.

History
Dissatisfied with GTK 3, LXDE maintainer Hong Jen Yee experimented with Qt in early 2013 and released the first version of a Qt-based PCMan File Manager on 26 March 2013. He clarified, though, that this means no departure from GTK in LXDE, saying "The GTK and Qt versions will coexist". He later ported LXDE's Xrandr front-end to Qt.

On 3 July 2013 Hong Jen Yee announced a Qt port of the full LXDE suite, and on 21 July 2013, Razor-qt and LXDE announced that they had decided to merge the two projects. This merge meant that the GTK and the Qt versions coexisted in the short term, but eventually development of the GTK version was dropped and all efforts were focused on the Qt port. The merger of LXDE-Qt and Razor-qt was renamed LXQt, and the first release, version 0.7.0, was made available on 7 May 2014.

With the 0.13 release on 21 May 2018 the LXQt project formally split from LXDE with the move to a separate GitHub organization.

Software components 
LXQt consists of many modular components, some of them depending on Qt and KDE Frameworks 5.

Adoption

Version history

See also 

 Razor-qt
 Comparison of X Window System desktop environments

References

External links 

 
 LXQt Roadmap (last update on Jun 16, 2016 for version 0.11)

 
2013 software
Free desktop environments
Software that uses Qt
Software that was ported from GTK to Qt